t(11;14) is a chromosomal translocation which essentially always involves the immunoglobulin heavy locus, also known as IGH in the q32 region of chromosome 14 , as well as cyclin D1 which is located in the q13 of chromosome 11 . Specifically, the translocation is at t(11;14)(q13;q32).

The translocation is mainly found in mantle cell lymphoma, but also in B-cell prolymphocytic leukemia, in plasma cell leukemia, in splenic lymphoma with villous lymphocytes, in chronic lymphocytic leukemia, and in multiple myeloma. All these diseases involve B-lineage lymphocytes.

Prognosis
In multiple myeloma, t(11;14) is a neutral prognostic factor in general, but it may confer a worse prognosis for overall survival in African American people with multiple myeloma.

References

Chromosomal translocations